Stenman is a surname. It means Mason and may refer to:

Eric Stenman, American record producer
Fredrik Stenman (born 1983), Swedish footballer